"House Party II (I Don't Know What You Come to Do)" is a song performed by Tony! Toni! Toné!, issued as the title track from the soundtrack to the film House Party 2. The song was written by band members Raphael Saadiq and Dwayne Wiggins; and it peaked at #19 on the Billboard R&B chart in 1991.

Music video

The official music video for the song was directed by Lionel C. Martin.

Charts

References
 it should be noted this song was a Regular “devotional” period song in the black church since 1972… The Tonyies changed some of the lyrics but the main part of the song, the “I don’t know what you come to do” and the “I come to clap my hands, I come stop stomp my feet” have been a staple of the black church long before House Party 2

External links
 
 

1991 singles
MCA Records singles
Music videos directed by Lionel C. Martin
Songs written by Raphael Saadiq
Songs written by D'wayne Wiggins
Tony! Toni! Toné! songs
1991 songs